Lannilis is a commune in the Finistère department of Brittany in north-western France.

Population
Inhabitants of Lannilis are called in French Lannilisiens.

Breton language
The municipality launched a linguistic plan concerning the Breton language through Ya d'ar brezhoneg on 27 June 2008.

In 2008, 33.17% of primary-school children attended bilingual schools.

See also
Communes of the Finistère department

References

External links

Official website

Mayors of Finistère Association 

Communes of Finistère